Sheikh Bahaei Square is a square in the Vanak area of the Iranian capital Tehran. The area around the square has been a centre for creative industries, including advertising agencies, luxury malls and office buildings.

Notable places
The area is well known as the centre for the Alzahra University dedicated to women's tertiary education. The square also hosts art exhibitions and galleries including Aun Gallery.

Iran's National Oil and Gas company has two of its headquarters around the square.

References

External links
 http://www.pagelous.com/en/pages/52f9cb0ea8fe20d829002cdc
 http://onlinelibrary.wiley.com/doi/10.1111/j.1747-5457.2009.00446.x/abstract

Squares in Tehran